Kofe Khauz (Кофе Хауз, Coffee House) is a chain of coffee shops in Russia and Ukraine. The company has currently over 200 stores. It is based in Moscow and was founded in 1999.

Criticism 
In summer of 2013, Ukrainian branch of the chain was accused of anti-Ukrainian sentiment and а disdain for visitors.

In summer of 2014 activists of the "Do not buy Russian goods!" campaign conducted several flash mobs and protests in many of the network's coffee shops in Kyiv. Young people handed out ammo to visitors and then fell as dead, informing people about the shops' Russian origin and that part of Coffee House's profit flows into Russian economy.

References

Food and drink companies based in Moscow
Coffeehouses and cafés in Russia
Russian brands